The Ministry of Tourism is a cabinet-level federal ministry created on January 1, 2003. It is responsible for Embratur, the Brazilian Tourist Board.

Developing tourism as a sustainable economic activity with a relevant role for the generation of jobs and foreign currency and providing social inclusion. The Ministry of Tourism is innovating in the handling of public policies with a decentralized management model, guided by strategic thinking.

Its organizational structure comprises the National Secretariat of Tourism Policies, which assumes the role of carrying out the national policy for the sector, oriented by the directives from the national Council of Tourism. In addition, it is responsible for the internal promotion and oversees the quality of the provision of the Brazilian tourism service.

The National Secretariat of Programs for the Development of Tourism is responsible for subsidizing the formulation of plans, programs and actions for the strengthening of national tourism. The duties of the body are the promotion and development of infrastructure and the improvement in the quality of the services rendered.

EMBRATUR – Brazilian Tourism Institute, established on November 18, 1966, as a Brazilian tourism enterprise, had the objective of fostering tourism activity by making feasible conditions for the generation of jobs, income and development throughout the country.

Since January 2003, upon the establishment of the Ministry of Tourism, EMBRATUR's actions were concentrated in the promotion, marketing and support to the trading of products, services and tourism destinations.

See also
 Federal institutions of Brazil

Notes and references

T
Ministries established in 2003
Brazil
Organisations based in Brasília